Louvois is a former commune in the Marne department in north-eastern France. On 1 January 2016, it was merged into the new commune Val de Livre.

The trouvère Jehan de Louvois was lord of the place in the 13th century.

Champagne
The village's vineyards are located in the Montagne de Reims subregion of Champagne, and are classified as Grand Cru (100%) in the Champagne vineyard classification.

References

See also

 Communes of the Marne department
 Classification of Champagne vineyards
 Montagne de Reims Regional Natural Park
 François-Michel le Tellier, Marquis de Louvois

Former communes of Marne (department)
Grand Cru Champagne villages